Hallowell may refer to:

Places
Hallowell, Maine, United States, a city in Kennebec County
Hallowell, Kansas, United States
Hallowell, Ontario, Canada

Other uses
 Hallowell (surname)
Hallowell family
 USS Hallowell (PF-72), a United States Navy patrol frigate later renamed USS Machias (PF-72) and then transferred prior to completion to the United Kingdom to serve in the Royal Navy from 1943 to 1946 as